Sybille Spindler is a former East German slalom canoeist who competed in the 1970s. She won two medals at the 1973 ICF Canoe Slalom World Championships in Muotathal with a gold in the K-1 event and a bronze in the K-1 team event.

References

East German female canoeists
Possibly living people
Year of birth missing (living people)
Medalists at the ICF Canoe Slalom World Championships